Edubuntu, previously known as Ubuntu Education Edition, was an official derivative of the Ubuntu operating system designed for use in classrooms inside schools, homes and communities.

Edubuntu was developed in collaboration with teachers and technologists in several countries. Edubuntu is built on top of the Ubuntu base, incorporates the LTSP thin client architecture and several education-specific applications, and is aimed at users aged 6 to 18. It was designed for easy installation and ongoing system maintenance.

Features 
Included with Edubuntu is the Linux Terminal Server Project and many applications relevant to education including GCompris, KDE Edutainment Suite, Sabayon Profile Manager, Pessulus Lockdown Editor, Edubuntu Menueditor, LibreOffice, Gnome Nanny and iTalc. Edubuntu CDs were previously available free of charge through their Shipit service;  it is only available as a download in a DVD format.

Edubuntu's default GUI is Unity, while GNOME is still available. Unity has been the default GUI since the release of 12.04. Since release 7.10, KDE is also available as Edubuntu KDE. In 2010, Edubuntu and the Qimo 4 Kids project were working on providing Qimo within Edubuntu, but this was not done as it would not have fit on a CD.

Project goals 
The primary goal of Edubuntu was to enable an educator with limited technical knowledge and skills to set up a computer lab or an on-line learning environment in an hour or less and then effectively administer that environment.

The principal design goals of Edubuntu were centralized management of configuration, users and processes, together with facilities for working collaboratively in a classroom setting. Equally important was the gathering together of the best available free software and digital materials for education. According to a statement of goals on the official Edubuntu website: "Our aim is to put together a system that contains all the best free software available in education and make it easy to install and maintain."

It also aimed to allow low income environments to maximize utilisation of their available (older) equipment.

Versions 

The first Edubuntu release coincided with the release of Ubuntu 5.10, which was codenamed Breezy Badger on 2005-10-13. With the 8.04 Hardy Heron release of Edubuntu it was given the name of Ubuntu Education Edition and was changed to be an add-on to a standard Ubuntu installation instead of being an installable LiveCD. From version 9.10 onwards, Edubuntu changed to be available as a full system DVD instead of an Add-on CD. Edubuntu is also installable via a selection of "edubuntu" packages for all distributions using the official Ubuntu repositories (Ubuntu and Kubuntu mainly).

Since 14.04, Edubuntu became LTS-only; Edubuntu announced that they would skip the 16.04 LTS update and that they planned on staying with 14.04 due to lack of contributors.

See also 

 List of Ubuntu-based distributions
 UberStudent Linux based on LTS versions of Xubuntu
 Skolelinux based on Debian
 Sugar-on-a-Stick educational Linux distribution based on Fedora

References

External links

 
 

 
2005 software
Educational operating systems
Free educational software
Linux Terminal Server Project
Ubuntu derivatives
Discontinued Linux distributions
Linux distributions